Stripper is a 1986 American documentary film directed by Jerome Gary. It depicts a strippers convention and contest and the strong motive to win of a few of the contestants.

References

External links

1986 films
1986 documentary films
20th Century Fox films
American documentary films
Films scored by Jack Nitzsche
Films about striptease
Films with screenplays by Charles Gaines
1980s English-language films
1980s American films